A Descant for Gossips may refer to:
 A Descant for Gossips (miniseries)
 A Descant for Gossips (novel)